Earle Gorton Linsley (May 1, 1910 in Oakland, California – March 8, 2000) was an American entomologist.

In study at the University of California, Berkeley Linsley gained a Bachelor of Science in 1932, a Master of Science in 1933, and Doctorate in 1938.

Linsley described many species including:
Pleocoma bicolor
Pleocoma blaisdelli
Pleocoma carinata
Pleocoma crinita
Pleocoma dubitabilis
Pleocoma hirticollis
Pleocoma lucia
Pleocoma minor
Pleocoma nitida
Pleocoma sonomae
Pleocoma venturae
Pleocoma trifoliata
Tetropium pilosicorne

Pleocoma linsleyi was named in his honor.

References

1910 births
2000 deaths
American entomologists
University of California, Berkeley alumni
20th-century American zoologists